Triethylborane (TEB), also called triethylboron, is an organoborane (a compound with a B–C bond). It is a colorless pyrophoric liquid. It is soluble in organic solvents tetrahydrofuran and hexane.

Preparation and structure
Triethylborane is prepared by the reaction of trimethyl borate with triethylaluminium:
Et3Al + (MeO)3B → Et3B + (MeO)3Al
The molecule is monomeric, unlike H3B and Et3Al, which tend to dimerize. It has a planar BC3 core.

Applications

Turbojet engine
Triethylborane was used to ignite the JP-7 fuel in the Pratt & Whitney J58 turbojet/ramjet engines powering the Lockheed SR-71 Blackbird and its predecessor, the A-12 OXCART. Triethylborane is suitable because it ignites readily upon exposure to oxygen. It was chosen as an ignition method for reliability reasons, and in the case of the Blackbird, because JP-7 fuel has very low volatility and is difficult to ignite. Conventional ignition plugs posed a high risk of malfunction. Triethylborane was used to start each engine and to ignite the afterburners.

Rocket
Mixed with 10–15% triethylaluminium, it was used before lift-off to ignite the F-1 engines on the Saturn V rocket.

The Merlin engines that power the SpaceX Falcon 9 rocket use a triethylaluminium-triethylborane mixture (TEA-TEB) as a first- and second-stage ignitor.

The Firefly Aerospace Alpha launch vehicle's Reaver engines are also ignited by a triethylaluminium-triethylborane mixture.

Organic chemistry
Industrially, triethylborane is used as an initiator in radical reactions, where it is effective even at low temperatures. As an initiator, it can replace some organotin compounds.

It reacts with metal enolates, yielding enoxytriethylborates that can be alkylated at the α-carbon atom of the ketone more selectively than in its absence.  For example, the enolate from treating cyclohexanone with potassium hydride produces 2-allylcyclohexanone in 90% yield when triethylborane is present.  Without it, the product mixture contains 43% of the mono-allylated product, 31% di-allylated cyclohexanones, and 28% unreacted starting material. The choice of base and temperature influences whether the more or less stable enolate is produced, allowing control over the position of substituents.  Starting from 2-methylcyclohexanone, reacting with potassium hydride and triethylborane in THF at room temperature leads to the more substituted (and more stable) enolate, whilst reaction at −78 °C with potassium hexamethyldisilazide,  and triethylborane generates the less substituted (and less stable) enolate. After reaction with methyl iodide the former mixture gives 2,2-dimethylcyclohexanone in 90% yield while the latter produces 2,6-dimethylcyclohexanone in 93% yield.

It is used in the Barton–McCombie deoxygenation reaction for deoxygenation of alcohols. In combination with lithium tri-tert-butoxyaluminum hydride it cleaves ethers. For example, THF is converted, after hydrolysis, to 1-butanol. It also promotes certain variants of the Reformatskii reaction.

Triethylborane is the precursor to the reducing agents lithium triethylborohydride ("Superhydride") and sodium triethylborohydride.
MH + Et3B → MBHEt3 (M = Li, Na)

Triethylborane reacts with methanol to form diethyl(methoxy)borane, which is used as the chelating agent in the Narasaka–Prasad reduction for the stereoselective generation of syn-1,3-diols from β-hydroxyketones.

Safety
Thus, it is typically handled and stored using air-free techniques. Triethylborane is also acutely toxic if swallowed, with an LD50 of 235 mg/kg in rat test subjects.

See also
Organoboranes
Pentaborane
Zip fuel

References

Alkylboranes
Rocket fuels